Eulimella boydae is a species of sea snail, a marine gastropod mollusk in the family Pyramidellidae, the pyrams and their allies.

The epithet "boydae" refers to Ms S. E. Boyd, curator of Mollusca at the Museum of Victoria, Australia.

Description
The size of the elongated shell varies between 2.8 mm and 3.1 mm. The conical shell lacks a spiral microstructure. The teleoconch consists of eight to nine rather low whorls with a clearly marked horizontal suture. The growth lines vary between orthocline (at right angles to the growth direction) and opisthocline (following the growth direction). The outer lip contains some teeth. An umbilicus is lacking. The columella shows a fold.

Distribution
This species occurs in the following locations:
 Cape Verdes at depths between 74 m and 80 m

References

External links
 To Encyclopedia of Life
 To World Register of Marine Species

boydae
Gastropods described in 2000
Gastropods of Cape Verde